The twenty-eighth government of Israel was formed by Ehud Barak of One Israel on 6 July 1999 after his victory in the May election for Prime Minister. Alongside One Israel (an alliance of the Labor Party, Meimad and Gesher), Barak included Shas, Meretz, Yisrael BaAliyah, the Centre Party, the National Religious Party and United Torah Judaism in his coalition. United Torah Judaism left the government in September 1999 due to a dispute over the transport of a turbine on Shabbat.

Following the outbreak of the Al-Aqsa Intifada, the government began to fall apart. Barak called a special election for Prime Minister in February 2001, which he lost to Likud leader Ariel Sharon. Sharon went on to form the twenty-ninth government on 7 March.

Cabinet members

1 Although Tamir was not a Knesset member at the time, she was later elected to the Knesset on the Labor Party list.

2 The name of the post was changed to Minister of Science, Culture and Sport when Vilnai took office.

References

External links
Thirteenth Knesset: Government 28 Knesset website

 28
1999 establishments in Israel
2001 disestablishments in Israel
Cabinets established in 1999
Cabinets disestablished in 2001
1999 in Israeli politics
2000 in Israeli politics
2001 in Israeli politics
 28
 28